The Drama Desk Award for Outstanding Lighting Design for a Play is an annual award presented by Drama Desk in recognition of achievements in the theatre among Broadway, Off Broadway and Off-Off Broadway productions.

Winners and nominees

2000s

2010s

2020s

See also
 Laurence Olivier Award for Best Lighting Design
 Tony Award for Best Lighting Design

References

External links
 Drama Desk official website

Lighting Design